Cambarus asperimanus, the mitten crayfish, is a species of crayfish in the family Cambaridae. It is found in North America.

The IUCN conservation status of Cambarus asperimanus is "LC", least concern, with no immediate threat to the species' survival. The IUCN status was reviewed in 2010.

References

Further reading

 
 
 

Cambaridae
Articles created by Qbugbot
Crustaceans described in 1914
Taxa named by Walter Faxon